Bhargavi Narayan (4 February 1938 – 14 February 2022) was an Indian actress in the Kannada film industry, and a theatre artist in Karnataka, India. Her notable films include Eradu Kanasu, Hanthakana Sanchu, Pallavi Anupallavi, and Baa Nalle Madhuchandrake.

Career 
Narayan has been a part of more than 22 films and many drama (theatre) plays in Kannada, including the television series Manthana and  Mukta. She has written and directed plays for AIR's women's programs and Women's Association for Children, Karnataka. She has worked as a member of Kannada Natak Academy.

Before beginning her career in the arts, Narayan worked as a manager in ESI Corporation, Bengaluru.

She wrote a book in Kannada, called Naa Kanda Nammavaru, published by Ankita Pustaka, Bengaluru.

Narayan was a speaker at the Bangalore Literature Festival 2018, Bengaluru.

Personal life and death 
Bhargavi was born on 4 February 1938 to Naamagiriyamma and M. Ramaswamy.

She was married to Belavadi Nanjundaiah Narayana, a.k.a. Makeup Nani (3 November 1929 – 4 December 2003), who was a Kannada film actor and makeup artist. They have four children: Sujatha, Prakash, Pradeep and Sudha. Prakash is an Indian theater, film, television and media personality, and a National Film Award recipient, for his directorial film Stumble in 2002. He is married to Chandrika, and their children are namely Meghana and Teju. Sudha, a Kannada film actress and theatre artist, is married to M. G. Satya and their children are Shantanu and Samyukta. Samyukta is also a Kannada film actress.

Narayan's autobiography, Naanu, Bhargavi ("I am, Bhargavi"), was released in 2012, by publisher Ankita Pustaka, Bengaluru. The book won awards from Karnataka State Sahitya Academy, Karnataka Sangha, Shimoga and Srimati Gangamma Somappa Bommai Pratishthana, Dharwad, Karnataka.

She died in Jayanagar, Bangalore on 14 February 2022, at the age of 84.

Awards 
 Karnataka State Film Awards – Best Supporting Actress (1974–75) – credit: actress in film Professor Huchuraya
 Karnataka State Nataka Academy Awards (1998) – credit: theatre/drama works
 Mangalore Prestigious Message Award – credit: screenplay, dialogue writer for Kannada serial: Kavalodeda Daari
 Alva's Nudisiri Awards (2005) – credit: theatre/drama works
 Karnataka State drama contest – best actress (twice)
 Karnataka State children drama contest (1974–75) – state level award – credit: scriptwriter and director for drama: Bhoothayyana Pechata

Selected filmography 
  Subba shastry (1967)
 Pallavi (1976)
 Muyyi (1979)
 Anthima Ghatta (1987)
 Jamboo Savari (1993)
 Stumble (2003)
 Kaada Beladingalu (2007)
 Idolle Ramayana (2016)
 Raajakumara (2018)
 Premier Padmini (2019)
 Butterfly 
 777 Charlie (2022)

See also 

List of people from Karnataka
Cinema of Karnataka
List of Indian film actresses
Cinema of India

References

External links

1938 births
2022 deaths
21st-century Indian actresses
Actresses in Kannada cinema
Kannada people
Actresses from Karnataka
Actresses from Bangalore
Indian film actresses
Actresses in Kannada television
Actresses in Kannada theatre
Recipients of the Rajyotsava Award 2019